Bedford Park is a southern suburb of Adelaide in South Australia.

The Hancock family established a homestead and farm at the foot of the Adelaide Hills in the mid 19th century. A family name from an earlier generation lent its name to the property of Bedford which was later changed to Bedford Park. In 1917,  of the property was purchased by the South Australian Government and a tuberculosis sanatorium was built. Initially housing World War I soldiers the sanatorium was expanded until, by 1924, it had 74 beds and was a self-supporting farm with pigs, chickens, orchards and grain production. The sanatorium was demolished and Flinders University built in its place in the 1960s.

Burbank Post Office opened on 26 September 1961 and was renamed Bedford Park in 1966, before closing in 1980.

Bedford Park is the home of Flinders University and the Flinders Medical Centre. The greater part of the suburb lies within the City of Mitcham, but the north west corner lies within the City of Marion where the Warriparinga wetlands and Living Kaurna Cultural Centre are located beside the Sturt River.

The suburb is in the state electorate of Davenport. It is in the federal Division of Boothby.

Population

In the 2016 Census, there were 1,836 people in Bedford Park. 46.2% of people were born in Australia. The next most common countries of birth were China 6.7% and Indonesia 5.5%. 50.4% of people only spoke English at home. Other languages spoken at home included Mandarin 10.6% and Indonesian 5.6%. The most common responses for religion were No Religion 38.1%, Catholic 15.1% and Islam 8.6%.

References

Suburbs of Adelaide